Mariano Vélez (1925 – 2004) was a Filipino boxer. He competed in the men's welterweight event at the 1948 Summer Olympics. At the 1948 Summer Olympics, he lost to Clifford Blackburn of Canada.

References

External links
 

1925 births
2004 deaths
Sportspeople from Cagayan de Oro
Filipino male boxers
Olympic boxers of the Philippines
Boxers at the 1948 Summer Olympics
Welterweight boxers